The 8th Illinois Infantry Regiment was an infantry regiment that served in the Union Army during the American Civil War.

Service

Initial 3 month service
The infantry regiment was organized at Springfield, Illinois and mustered in on April 25th, 1861 for a three-month service. The regiment was transferred to Cairo, Illinois, for duty until July, 1861. Companies "B" and "C" formed part of an expedition from Cairo to Little River on June 22nd and 23rd. By the time the regiment was mustered out on July 25th, 1861, they had lost three to disease.

3 year enlistments
The regiment was reorganized with 3-year enlistees at Cairo, Illinois, on July 25, 1861. The 8th Illinois saw action at the Battle of Fort Henry, the Battle of Fort Donelson, the Battle of Shiloh, the Siege of Corinth, the Vicksburg Campaign, and the Mobile Campaign.

The regiment was mustered out of service on May 4, 1866, at Baton Rouge, Louisiana. Among the notables that served in the regiment was Major Hermann Lieb, who later commanded the Union forces at the Battle of Milliken's Bend.

Total strength and casualties
The battery suffered 6 officers and 160 enlisted men killed in action or died of wounds and 155 enlisted men who died of disease, for a total of 321 fatalities.

Commanders
 Colonel Richard J. Oglesby - promoted to brigadier general April 1, 1862
 Colonel Frank L. Rhoades - resigned October 7, 1862
 Colonel John P. Post - resigned September 28, 1863
 Colonel Josiah A. Sheetz - mustered out with the regiment

See also

List of Illinois Civil War Units
Illinois in the American Civil War

References

Bibliography 
 Dyer, Frederick H. (1959). A Compendium of the War of the Rebellion. New York and London. Thomas Yoseloff, Publisher. .

External links
The Civil War Archive

Units and formations of the Union Army from Illinois
1861 establishments in Illinois
Military units and formations established in 1861
Military units and formations disestablished in 1866
1866 disestablishments in Illinois